Neolissochilus paucisquamatus is a species of cyprinid in the genus Neolissochilus. It inhabits Myanmar and Thailand and is not considered threatened or endangered.

References

Cyprinidae
Cyprinid fish of Asia
Fish of Myanmar
Fish of Thailand
Fish described in 1945